Joseph Phillip Cassidy (February 8, 1883 – March 25, 1906) was an American Major League Baseball player from Chester, Pennsylvania who mainly played shortstop for the Washington Senators from 1904 to 1905.  He was an alumnus of Villanova University.

Cassidy died in his hometown at age 23, from complications of malaria, and is interred at Immaculate Heart Cemetery.

See also
List of Major League Baseball annual triples leaders
List of baseball players who died during their careers

References

External links

1883 births
1906 deaths
Major League Baseball shortstops
Baseball players from Pennsylvania
Sportspeople from Chester, Pennsylvania
Washington Senators (1901–1960) players
Villanova University alumni
Deaths from malaria